Marigold Merlyn Baillieu Southey, Lady Southey  (born 2 May 1928) is an Australian philanthropist who served as Lieutenant-Governor of Victoria from 2001 to 2006.

Lady Southey was born in San Francisco into the Myer family, the youngest of four children of Sidney and Merlyn Myer. She was educated at St Catherine's School, Toorak and the University of Melbourne.

From the mid-1950s until 1999, she was director of the Myer family companies. In 1996, she succeeded her brother, Sidney, as president of the philanthropic Myer Foundation until she resigned in 2004.

On 1 January 2001, Lady Southey was appointed Lieutenant-Governor of Victoria under Governor John Landy.

In 1950, she married Ross Shelmerdine, who died in 1979—they had four children. In 1982, she married businessman and former Liberal Party president Sir Robert Southey, becoming Lady Southey.

References

1928 births
Living people
Australian women philanthropists
Australian philanthropists
Philanthropists from Melbourne
Companions of the Order of Australia
Recipients of the Centenary Medal
University of Melbourne alumni
Australian people of Belarusian-Jewish descent
Lieutenant-Governors of Victoria
21st-century women philanthropists
Myer family
People educated at St Catherine's School, Melbourne